The Sony α7R V (model ILCE-7RM5) is a full-frame mirrorless interchangeable-lens camera manufactured by Sony. It was announced in October 2022 as the successor to the Sony α7R IV launched 2.5 years prior.

Image gallery

See also
Comparison of Sony α7 cameras

References

External links
 Sony α7R V

α7R V
Cameras introduced in 2022
Full-frame mirrorless interchangeable lens cameras